Ecoredipharm Toamasina is a Malagasy football club who currently plays in the Malagasy Second Division the second division of Malagasy football.
The team is based in Toamasina city in eastern Madagascar.

In 2003 the team has won the THB Champions League.

Stadium
Currently the team plays at the 2500 capacity Stade Municipal de Toamasina.

Honours
THB Champions League
Champion (1): 2003

Performance in CAF competitions
CAF Champions League: 1 appearance
2004 – First Round

See also
2004 CAF Champions League

References

External links
Team profile - scoreshelf.com

Football clubs in Madagascar